Raphiinae may refer to:

Raphiinae (moth), a subfamily of moths in the family Noctuidae
Raphiinae (plant), a subtribe of plants in the family Arecaceae